Franz Böckli (March 15, 1858 – February 14, 1937) was a Swiss sport shooter who competed in the early 20th century. He participated in Shooting at the 1900 Summer Olympics in Paris and earned a gold medal with the Military rifle team for Switzerland.

References

External links

Swiss male sport shooters
Olympic gold medalists for Switzerland
Olympic shooters of Switzerland
Shooters at the 1900 Summer Olympics
1858 births
1937 deaths
Place of birth missing
Olympic medalists in shooting

Medalists at the 1900 Summer Olympics
Place of death missing